Fritz Kocher (born 6 April 1928) was a Swiss cross-country skier who competed in the 1950s and 1960s. Competing in three Winter Olympics, he earned his best finish of seventh in the 4 x 10 km relay at Cortina d'Ampezzo in 1956.

References
Olympic 4 x 10 km cross country results: 1936-2002

External links
  

Olympic cross-country skiers of Switzerland
Cross-country skiers at the 1952 Winter Olympics
Cross-country skiers at the 1956 Winter Olympics
Cross-country skiers at the 1960 Winter Olympics
Swiss male cross-country skiers
1928 births
Year of death missing